Below is a list of cast members on the Brazilian television series Malhação'''.

 Alexandre Frota
 Cláudio Heinrich
 Sophia Abrahão
 Monique Alfradique
 Jéssika Alves
 Guilherme Berenguer
 Bianca Bin
 Ludmila Dayer
 Juliana Didone
 Nathalia Dill
 Marjorie Estiano
 Priscila Fantin
 Juliana Knust
 Rodrigo Faro
 Maria Flor
 Mário Frias
 Cássia Linhares
 Juliana Lohmann
 André Marques
 Juliana Martins
 Ariela Massotti
 Danton Mello
 Mariana Molina
 Cristiana Peres
 Luana Piovani
 Mariana Rios
 Bianca Rinaldi
 Fernanda Rodrigues
 Juliana Silveira
 Thaila Ayala
 Milena Toscano
 Fernanda Vasconcellos
 Pedro Vasconcellos
 Graziella Schmitt
 Sophie Charlotte
 Bruno Gissoni
 Ronny Kriwat
(and dozens of others, throughout more than 20 seasons)

References

Malhacao actors